"Don't Cry, Joe (Let Her Go, Let Her Go, Let Her Go)" is a popular song written by Joe Marsala, and recorded by Johnny Desmond on May 21, 1949.

Frank Sinatra recording
The recording was released by MGM (catalog number 10518) and reached #22 on the Billboard chart.  Frank Sinatra recorded an effective version that reached #6 the same year. The Sinatra version can be found on various Columbia re-issues of his work. He later re-recorded the song in 1961 for his Sinatra Swings album.

Other recordings
Sammy Davis Jr. recorded the song for this album When the Feeling Hits You! (1965).

References

1949 singles
Johnny Desmond songs
Frank Sinatra songs
Songs written by Joe Marsala